Eilema pulverea is a moth of the subfamily Arctiinae first described by Alfred Ernest Wileman in 1910. It is found in Taiwan.

The wingspan is 34–41 mm.

References

Moths described in 1910
pulverea
Moths of Taiwan